Sibirenauta elongata is a species of gastropods belonging to the family Physidae.

The species is found in Northern America.

References

Physidae